Theodor Möbius (June 22, 1821 Leipzig - April 25, 1890) was a German philologist who specialized in Germanic studies.

Biography
He was a son of German mathematician August Ferdinand Möbius. He studied at the Universities of Leipzig (1840–42) and Berlin (1842-43), receiving his doctorate in 1844 at Leipzig. From 1845 to 1861, he was an assistant, then later curator, at the university library. He earned his habilitation at Leipzig in 1852 with the thesis Über die ältere isländische Saga, and in 1859 became a professor of Scandinavian languages and literature there. In 1865, he accepted a similar position at Kiel. He edited many old Norse works.

Selected works 
 Catalogus librorum islandicorum et norvegicorum ætatis mediæ editorum versorum illustratorum : Skáldatal sive Poetarum recensus Eddæ upsaliensis, Lipsiæ : Apud W. Engelmannum, 1856.
 Altnordisches Glossar : wörterbuch zu einer Auswahl alt-isländischer und alt-norwegischer Prosatexte, Leipzig : B.G. Teubner, 1866 – Old Norse glossary: Dictionary of a selection of Old Icelandic and Old Norwegian prose.
 Uber die Altnordische Sprache, Halle, Waisenhaus, 1872 – Old Norse languages.
 Die lieder der Älteren Edda, Paderborn : F. Schöningh, 1876. (Completed after Karl Hildebrand's death (from p. 257) by Möbius).
 Analecta norrœna : Auswahl aus der isländischen und norwegischen Litteratur des Mittelalters, Leipzig : J.C. Hinrichs, second edition 1877 – "Analecta Norröna": Selections from Icelandic and Norwegian literature of the Middle Ages.

See also

 Hugo Gering
 Eugen Mogk
 Andreas Heusler

References

External links
Hans Fix: „Lieber Möbius!“ Karl Weinholds Breslauer Briefe an Theodor Möbius (1874-1889). In: Śląska republika uczonych • Schlesische Gelehrtenrepublik • Slezská vědecká obec, vol. 7, hg. v. Marek Hałub u. Anna Mańko-Matysiak. Dresden-Wrocław 2016. S. 249-359. .

1821 births
1890 deaths
Germanic studies scholars
Old Norse studies scholars
German philologists
Leipzig University alumni
Academic staff of Leipzig University
Academic staff of the University of Kiel